Barolineocerus elongatus is a species of leafhopper native to Colombia. It is named for the very long male subgenital plates. It is distinguished from other species in the genus by the shortened protrusions of the male anal tube, and the prominent ventral spine on the reproductive organ.

References 

Hemiptera of South America
Arthropods of Colombia
Endemic fauna of Colombia
Fauna of the Amazon
Insects described in 2008
Eurymelinae